William Brewster (c. 1566/67 – 10 April 1644) was an English official and Mayflower passenger in 1620. He became senior elder and the leader of Plymouth Colony, by virtue of his education and existing stature with those immigrating from the Netherlands, being a Brownist (or Puritan Separatist).

Life in England 
William Brewster was born in 1566 or 1567, most probably in Scrooby, Nottinghamshire, England. He was the son of William Brewster and Mary (Smythe) (Simkinson) Brewster and he had a number of step-brothers and step-sisters, including James, Prudence, Henry, George, and Edward Brewster. His paternal grandparents were William Brewster (1510–1558), and Maud Mann (1513–1558). Their other children were: Fear, (vicar) Henry, Prudence and Thomas Brewster.

Beginning in 1580, he studied briefly at Peterhouse, Cambridge, before entering the service of William Davison, ambassador to the Netherlands, in 1584, giving him opportunity to hear and see more of reformed religion. Brewster was the only Pilgrim with political and diplomatic experience. With his mentor in prison, Brewster had returned home to Scrooby for a time, where he took up his father's former position as postmaster in 1590. The historian Stephen Tomkins argues that William and Mary became puritans in the mid-to-late 1590s, judging by the names of their children, which became much more puritan after Jonathan. It appears their daughter Fear, born about 1606, was named after her great-aunt Fear Brewster, who died unmarried about two years after William's daughter Fear was born.  

Following the campaign led by Archbishop Bancroft to force puritan ministers out of the Church of England, the Brewsters joined the Brownist church led by John Robinson and Richard Clifton, inviting them to meet in their manor house in Scrooby. Restrictions and pressures applied by the authorities convinced the congregation of a need to emigrate to the more sympathetic atmosphere of Holland, and Brewster organised the removal. Leaving England without permission was illegal at the time, so that departure was a complex matter. On its first attempt, in 1607, the group was arrested at Scotia Creek, but in 1608, Brewster and others were successful in leaving from the Humber.

Life in Holland 
 
Robinson's church lived for a year in Amsterdam, but in 1609 one of their fellow Brownist churches there led by John Smyth became the first Baptist church. In the controversy that followed, Robinson and Brewster decided to take their church to Leiden.

Brewster lived near St. Peter's church (Dutch: Pieterskerk) in Leiden with his wife and children. He was chosen as assistant and later as an elder to Pastor John Robinson. He was still an elder when he traveled to Plymouth Colony in 1620.

In Leiden, the group managed to make a living. Brewster had struggled for money in Amsterdam, but in Leiden he taught English to university students. In 1610–11, Robinson and Brewster acted as mediators when the Ancient Church, the oldest Brownist congregation in Amsterdam, split into two factions following Francis Johnson and Henry Ainsworth, but they failed to reconcile them.

Brewster printed and published religious books for sale in England, but they were proscribed there. The press was prolific, printing "seven books against the regime of the Church of England in 1618 alone." In 1618, Brewster's press published De regimine Ecclesianae Scoticanae by Scottish minister David Calderwood, which was highly critical of James VI and his government of the Kirk. They followed it up in April 1619 with Perth Assembly. King James ordered an international manhunt for the writer and printer, but Brewster went underground. According to historian Stephen Tomkins, Brewster handed himself over to the Dutch authorities, who refused to send him to his death in England and so told James that they had arrested the wrong person and let him go. Tomkins judges that Brewster's printing operation "came close to ruining his church's plans for America".

Brewster and Robinson were the prime movers in the decision to sail for America, but once he was in hiding the Separatists looked to their deacon John Carver and to Robert Cushman to carry on negotiations with the appropriate officials in London.
Brewster returned to the Leiden congregation in 1620, when it was time for the Speedwell to sail to England. He had been hiding out in Holland and perhaps even England for the last year. At the time of his return, Brewster was the highest-ranking layman of the congregation and was their designated elder in Plymouth Colony.

Brewster joined the first group of Separatists aboard the Mayflower on the voyage to America. He was accompanied by his wife Mary and his sons Love and Wrestling.

Mayflower voyage 
  
Among the people boarding the Mayflower were four unaccompanied children from Shipton, Shropshire. They were placed as indentured servants with senior Separatists William Brewster, John Carver and Robert Cushman, on behalf of Samuel More, husband of the children's mother, Katherine More. The children were placed without their mother's permission after four rancorous years between the Mores over charges of adultery against Katherine and her longtime lover, the children's alleged father. Two children were placed with William and Mary Brewster.<ref>Donald F. Harris, PhD., the Mayflower Descendant (July 1994) vol. 44 no. 2 pp. 112–114.</ref>

The Mayflower departed Plymouth in England in September 1620. The 100-foot vessel carried 102 passengers and a crew of 30 to 40 in extremely cramped conditions. During the voyage, the ship was buffeted by strong westerly gales. The caulking of its planks was failing to keep out sea water, and the passengers' berths were not always dry. On the journey there were two deaths, a crew member and a passenger. After being blown off course by gales, the Mayflower made a landing at Cape Cod. Finding the area near Provincetown occupied by indigenous people, the ship's company decided to continue exploring along the nearby coast. The group arrived in the area near present-day Plymouth, Massachusetts, on 21 December 1620. In the space of several months almost half the passengers perished in the cold, harsh New England winter.

 In Plymouth Colony 

When the passengers of the Mayflower landed at Plymouth Colony, Brewster became the senior elder, and so served as the religious leader of the colony; in the colony, he became a separatist leader and preacher, and eventually, as an adviser to Governor William Bradford. Brewster's son Jonathan joined the family in November 1621, arriving at Plymouth on the ship Fortune, and daughters Patience and Fear arrived in July 1623 aboard the Anne.

As the only university-educated member of the colony, Brewster took the part of the colony's religious leader until pastor Ralph Smith arrived in 1629. Thereafter, he continued to preach irregularly until his death in April 1644. "He was tenderhearted and compassionate of such as were in misery," Bradford wrote, "but especially of such as had been of good estate and rank and fallen unto want and poverty."

Brewster was granted land among the islands of Boston Harbor, and four of the outer islands (Great Brewster, Little Brewster, Middle Brewster, and Outer Brewster) now bear his name. In 1632, he received lands in nearby Duxbury and removed from Plymouth to create a farm there.

In 1634, smallpox and influenza ravaged both the English and the Indians in the region. Brewster's family had managed to survive the first terrible winter unscathed, but they lost daughters Fear and Patience, now married to Isaac Allerton and Thomas Prence, respectively.

Family and other charges

Marriage
About 1590 or 1592, William Brewster married a woman named Mary,Charles Edward Banks, The English Ancestry and Homes of the Pilgrim Fathers: who came to Plymouth on the Mayflower in 1620, the Fortune in 1621, and the Anne and the Little James in 1623 (Baltimore, MD.: Genealogical Publishing Co., 2006) pp. 36, 37 whose surname is unknown, although researchers have proposed Wentworth and Wyrall, along with a handful of children—all of which have been disproved with documentation, as summarized in the 2014 'silver' volume on William Brewster published by the General Society of Mayflower Descendants. No formal record of the marriage of William Brewster appears in the preserved marriage records of Nottinghamshire Archives. Clandestine marriages and marriages without banns or license before an officiant were not unknown in Nottinghamshire around 1590–96. Thus it is possible one of the following officiated at the marriage about 1590–92 of William Brewster: 1) his uncle Henry Brewster, vicar of Sutton-cum-Lound 1565–94; 2) John Naylor, who was vicar of North Clifton 1588–1626+ and was involved in a clandestine marriage 1 December 1591; and 3) Thomas Hancock, curate of Headon until 1592 when curate of West Retford, and who was presented in 1592 for marrying R. Southworth in Scrooby Chapel without banns or license while curate of Headon. The extensive search for further information on Mary continues, and the number of researchers includes Jeremy Bangs, Director of the American Pilgrim Museum in Leiden, Holland; Caleb Johnson; and Louise Throop.

Children
Their first surviving child Jonathan was born on August 12, 1593, according to "The Brewster Book" in the handwriting of Jonathan. The first three known children were born in Scrooby, Nottinghamshire. A more comprehensive list of children is as follows, although there were possibly children born 1591, 1595, 1597, and 1602, who would have possibly died in the plague of the autumn of 1603 and the winter of 1603–4. Others born 1604 and 1608 may also have died young:
 Jonathan Brewster (August 12, 1593 – August 7, 1659) married Lucretia Oldham of Derby on April 10, 1624 and were the parents of 8 children. 
 Patience Brewster (c. 1600 – December 12, 1634) married Gov. Thomas Prence of Lechlade, Gloucestershire, 4 children. 
 Fear Brewster (c. 1606 – before 1634), apparently named after her great-aunt Fear Brewster. Married Isaac Allerton of London, 2 children. 
 Unnamed child was born, died, and buried in 1609 in Leiden, Holland. 
 Love Brewster was born in Leiden, Holland about 1611 and died between October 6, 1650 and January 31, 1650–1 at Duxbury, in Plymouth Colony. At the age of about 9, he traveled on the Mayflower to Plymouth Colony with his father, mother, and brother Wrestling. There he married Sarah Collier on May 15, 1634. Love and Sarah were the parents of four children. 
 Wrestling Brewster was born in 1614 in Leiden, Holland, was living in 1627, and died unmarried before the 1644 settlement of his father's estate.

 Other charges 

Three of the Mayflower pilgrims, including William Brewster, took responsibility for children of Samuel More, who accompanied him and others as indentured servants:
 Mary More, age 4, assigned as a servant of William Brewster. She died sometime in the winter of 1620–1. Her burial place is unknown, but may have been on Cole's Hill in Plymouth in an unmarked grave, as with so many others buried there that winter. As with her sister Ellen, she is recognized on the Pilgrim Memorial Tomb in Plymouth, misidentified after her sister's name as "and a brother (children)," the mistake of calling her "a brother" arising from William Bradford's failing memory years after the event of her death.
 Richard More, age 6, servant of William Brewster. He resided with the Brewster family until about mid-1627 when his term of indentureship expired. His name appears, at age 14, in a census as a member of the Brewster family, in what was called then "New Plimouth". By 1628, Richard was in the employ of Pilgrim Isaac Allerton, who was engaged in trans-Atlantic trading.

In addition to these, Jasper More, age 7, was assigned to John Carver as a servant, but died of a "common infection" in December 1620 while the Mayflower was in Cape Cod Harbor (several weeks after Elinor). He was buried ashore in the area of what is now Provincetown, where a memorial plaque bears his and the names of four others "who died at sea while the ship lay at Cape Cod Harbor" in November/December 1620. Finally, Elinor More, age 8, was assigned to Edward Winslow as a servant, but died in November 1620 soon after the arrival of the Mayflower at Cape Cod Harbor. Her burial place is unknown, but may have been ashore on Cape Cod similar to her brother Jasper. With many others who died that winter, her name appears on the Pilgrim Memorial Tomb, Cole's Hill, Plymouth, Massachusetts.Harris, Donald F. (1994). "The More Children of the Mayflower, Part III," The Mayflower Descendant, Vol. 44, no. 2 (July), p. 4.Nick Bunker, Making Haste from Babylon: The Mayflower Pilgrims and Their New World, (New York: Alfred A. Knopf, 2010) pp. 253–254

 Death 
William Brewster died on 10 April 1644, at Duxbury, Plymouth Colony. He was predeceased by his wife, Mary Brewster, who died in April 1627, aged about sixty.Caleb H. Johnson, The Mayflower and Her Passengers (Indiana: Xlibris Corp., copyright 2006 Caleb Johnson), pp. 94 & 98 Brewster's body was buried at Burial Hill in Plymouth. A memorial stone exists there for him, which states that it is in honour of "Elder William Brewster, Patriarch of the Pilgrims and their Ruling Elder 1609–1644". The burial place of his wife Mary is unknown. William Brewster was characterized in a 1992 biography as the "father of New England" and a "sine qua non of the entire Pilgrim adventure, its backbone, its brain and its conscience."

Places and things named after Brewster
 Great Brewster Island
 Little Brewster Island
 Middle Brewster Island
 Outer Brewster Island
 Brewster, Massachusetts
 Brewster Gardens
 Brewster Chair
 Brewster, Nebraska
 William Brewstersteeg ("Brewster's Alley"), Leiden

 Notable descendants 

Elder Brewster's descendants number in the tens of thousands today. Notable among them are:
 Isaac Allerton Jr., merchant and Colonial Virginia officeholderJones, 38
 H. Verlan Andersen, LDS General Authority
 Roger Nash Baldwin, co-founder of the American Civil Liberties Union (ACLU)
 Alfred Ely Beach, inventor, publisher, and patent lawyer
 Emilie Beardsley, nurse
 Harriot Eaton Stanton Blatch, writer and suffragist, daughter of Elizabeth Cady Stanton
 Nora Stanton Blatch Barney, suffragist, granddaughter of Elizabeth Cady StantonJones, 767
 Lindy Boggs, first woman elected to Congress from Louisiana
 Bishop Benjamin Brewster, Episcopal Bishop of Maine, Missionary Bishop of Western ColoradoJones, 781f
 Benjamin Brewster, industrialist, financier, original trustee of Standard OilJones, 352
 Caleb Brewster, farmer, blacksmith, and a member of the Culper spy ring during the American Revolutionary War
 Cora Belle Brewster (1859–?), physician, surgeon, medical writer, editor
 Flora A. Brewster (1852–1919), Baltimore's first woman surgeon
 Pete Seeger, American Folk Singer
 David Brewster, journalistJones, 626
 Diane Brewster, television actressJones, 627
 James Brewster, coachbuilder, immortalized in Cole Porter's song "You're the Top"
 Janet Huntington Brewster, philanthropist, writer, and radio broadcasterJones, 235
 John Brewster Jr., painter
 Jordana Brewster, actress
 Kingman Brewster Jr., educator and diplomatObituary: "Kingman Brewster, Jr." The New York Times 9 November 1988.
 Paget Brewster, actress
 Ralph Owen Brewster, United States Senator from MaineJones, 144
 Julia Child, chef and television personality
 Bob Crosby, Dixieland bandleader and vocalist
 Bing Crosby, singer and actor
 Frances Jane "Fanny" Crosby, hymnwriter
 Ted Danson, actor
Angela Davis, political activist, philosopher, academic, and author.
 Howard Dean, physician, former governor of Vermont, 2004 presidential candidate
 Allen Welsh Dulles, Director of Central Intelligence, member of the Warren CommissionJones, p. 16
 Avery Dulles, Jesuit priest, theologian, professor and Roman Catholic cardinal
 John Foster Dulles, U.S. Secretary of State under President Eisenhower
 John Ely, Revolutionary War colonel
 Richard Gere, actor
 Lawrence Henry Gipson, historian
 Dorothy Lake Gregory, artist and illustrator
 Hannibal Hamlin, fifteenth U.S. Vice President, under President Lincoln
 Katharine Hepburn, actress
 Ernest Lester Jones, head of the USGS; co-founder of the American Legion
 Ashley Judd, actress
 Oliver La Farge, writer and anthropologistJones, 21
 George Trumbull Ladd, philosopher and psychologistJones, 620
 John Lithgow, actor
 Henry Wadsworth Longfellow, poet
 Seth MacFarlane, writer, producer and voice actor
 Edwin Markham, American poet
 Jan Garrigue Masaryk, Czech diplomat and politician
 Neal A. Maxwell (1926–2004), American theologian, author, lecturer
 George B. McClellan, Civil War general; politicianJones, 19
 Robert Noyce, inventor of the integrated circuit
 Sarah Palin, former Governor of Alaska, 2008 Republican vice presidential nominee
 Harold E. B. Pardee, American cardiologist
 Commodore Matthew C. Perry, U.S. Navy commander at the opening of Japan
 Commodore Oliver Hazard Perry, U.S. Navy commander, War of 1812
 James Leonard Plimpton, inventor
 Thomas Pynchon, novelist
 Cokie Roberts, journalist and author
 Jay Rockefeller, U.S. Senator from West VirginiaJones, 901
 Nelson Rockefeller, 49th Governor of New York, 41st U.S. Vice President , businessman, philanthropist
 Brewster H. Shaw, NASA astronaut
 Andrew Shue and Elisabeth Shue, actors
Robert P. Shuler, American evangelist
 David Souter, Associate Justice of the U.S. Supreme Court
 William F. Halsey Jr., Fleet Admiral, USN
 John Trumbull Robinson, U.S. attorney for the district of Connecticut
 Henry Stanton, abolitionist, social reformerJones, 341
 Adlai Stevenson III, U.S. Senator from Illinois
 Arthur Ochs Sulzberger Jr., publisher of The New York Times Telford Taylor (24 February 1908 – 23 May 1998), an American lawyer best known for his role as Counsel for the Prosecution at the Nuremberg Trials after World War II. Descendant of William Brewster's daughter, Patience. 
 Zachary Taylor, 12th President of the United StatesJones, 252
 Kip Thorne, theoretical physicist; his 6th great-grandparents were Tabitha Brewster and Phineas Strong
 Peter J Wirs, Trustee of the Lincoln Charitable Trust
 Stuart Taylor Wood, ninth Commissioner of the Royal Canadian Mounted Police
 Sewall Green Wright, geneticist

 References 

 Sources 
 
 Jones, Emma C. Brewster (1908). The Brewster Genealogy, 1566–1907: A Record of the Descendants of William Brewster of the "Mayflower," Ruling Elder of the Pilgrim Church Which Founded Plymouth Colony in 1620, New York, NY, US: Grafton Press.
 
 

Further reading
 
 
 Brewster, Emma C., The Brewster Genealogy, 1566–1907: a Record of the Descendants of William Brewster of the "Mayflower," ruling elder of the Pilgrim church which founded Plymouth Colony in 1620 (New York: Grafton Press. 1908), Volume 1, Volume 2.
 
 'Brewster, William' in the American National Biography (2000) and the Oxford Dictionary of National Biography (2004).
 Mary B. Sherwood, Pilgrim: A Biography of William Brewster (1982)
 Richard Greaves and Robert Zaller, eds. Biographical Dictionary of British Radicals in the Seveneeth Century (1982)
 Dorothy Brewster, William Brewster of the Mayflower (1970)
 
 Dowsing, J. Places of the Pilgrim Fathers'' Sunrise Press, London.
 David Beale, "The Mayflower Pilgrims: Roots of the Puritan, Presbyterian, Congregationalist, and Baptist Heritage" (Greenville, SC: Emerald House Group and BJU Press, 2000).

External links
 The Elder William Brewster Society, A Pilgrim Lineage Society
 Society of Mayflower Descendants in the Commonwealth of Pennsylvania
 

1560s births
1644 deaths
People from Scrooby
Mayflower passengers
American Congregationalists
Alumni of Peterhouse, Cambridge
16th-century English people
17th-century English people
English separatists
American theologians
People from Plymouth, Massachusetts
People from Duxbury, Massachusetts
People from Doncaster
Zachary Taylor family
Burials at Burial Hill